The 1968–69 Marquette Warriors men's basketball team represented Marquette University during the 1968–69 NCAA University Division men's basketball season.

Schedule

References 

Marquette Golden Eagles men's basketball seasons
Marq
Marq
Marquette
Marquette